Catherine Hill Bay is a coastal bay and village on the southern peninsula forming Lake Macquarie, south of the Pacific Ocean entrance channel at Swansea in New South Wales, Australia. It is part of the City of Lake Macquarie local government area. The village is the oldest continuous settlement in the City of Lake Macquarie.  The Aboriginal people in this area, the Awabakal were the first people of this land.

A surf club is sited overlooking the beach that is quite popular for recreation.

Mining
The settlement was first made after land was purchased on 1 April 1865. The town of Cowper was created, to serve as a base for coal mining by the New Wallsend Company in 1873 with the first shipment on 17 December of that year. The name Catherine Hill was adopted to commemorate the schooner Catherine Hill that had run aground in 1867.

Later, the Wallarah Coal Company mined and shipped coal from the area including its nearby Crangan Bay mine. This was taken over by the Coal and Allied Group.

A railway originally was used to transport the coal to the wharf; later, trucks and automated loading belt systems were used.

Rutile was mined from the beach sands during the 1960s.

Population
In the 2016 Census, there were 162 people in Catherine Hill Bay. 89.3% of people were born in Australia and 93.5% of people spoke only English at home.

Development
Proposals for rezoning and redevelopment of the area for housing were opposed by LMCC and residents as the land was zoned for conservation. Environmentalists contended that the heathlands around the village contained a large variety of wildflowers, some dwarfed into unusual forms from the exposed coastal conditions. On 1 September 2009, a court ruled the development agreement illegal.

However, a new Housing Development of 550 houses was approved by the State Government in 2010. This new subdivision, called Beaches Catherine Hill Bay is outside the visual catchment of the heritage village.

Heritage listings
Catherine Hill Bay has been placed on the State Heritage Register as a Heritage Township:
 No. 208 Radar Station RAAF
 Catherine Hill Bay Cultural Precinct

References

External links
 History of Catherine Hill Bay (Lake Macquarie City Library)

Suburbs of Lake Macquarie
Bays of New South Wales
Coastal towns in New South Wales
Mining towns in New South Wales